Taxtalar is a village and municipality in the Davachi Rayon of Azerbaijan. It has a population of 532.

References

Populated places in Shabran District